William Jason Morgan (born October 10, 1935) is an American geophysicist who has made seminal contributions to the theory of plate tectonics and geodynamics. He retired as the Knox Taylor Professor emeritus of geology and professor of geosciences at Princeton University. He currently serves as a visiting scholar in the Department of Earth and Planetary Sciences at Harvard University.

Life and main scientific contributions 
After having received his BSc in physics from the Georgia Institute of Technology in 1957, he went to Princeton University, where he completed his PhD in 1964 under the supervision of Bob Dicke. He joined the faculty of the university immediately afterwards. 
 
His first major contribution, made in the late 1960s, was to relate the magnetic anomalies of alternating polarity, which occur on the ocean bottom at both sides of a mid-ocean ridge, to seafloor spreading and plate tectonics.

From 1971 on he worked on the further development of the plume theory of Tuzo Wilson, which postulates the existence of roughly cylindrical convective upwellings in the Earth's mantle as an explanation of hotspots. Wilson originally applied the concept to Hawaii and explained the increase in age of the seamounts of the Hawaii-Emperor chain with increasing distance from the current hotspot location; however, the concept was subsequently applied to many other hotspots by Morgan and other scientists.

Morgan has received many honors and awards for his work, among them the Bucher Award (1972), the Alfred Wegener Medal of the European Geosciences Union (1983), the Maurice Ewing Medal of the American Geophysical Union (1987), the Japan Prize (1990), the Wollaston Medal of the Geological Society of London (1994) and the National Medal of Science of the USA, award year 2002.

"The theory of plate tectonics he published in 1968 is one of the major milestones of U.S. science in the 20th century," F. A. Dahlen, chair of the Princeton Department of Geosciences, wrote in 2003.

"Essentially all of the research in solid-earth geophysical sciences in the past 30 to 35 years has been firmly grounded upon Jason Morgan's plate tectonic theory," Dahlen said. "The scientific careers of a generation of geologists and geophysicists have been founded upon his landmark 1968 paper."

Selected publications 
  1968 JGR publication, full text

References

External links 

Georgia Tech alumni biography
Lamont-Doherty bio
National Medal of Science, Princeton

1935 births
Members of the United States National Academy of Sciences
Living people
American geophysicists
American geologists
National Medal of Science laureates
People from Savannah, Georgia
Georgia Tech alumni
Members of the French Academy of Sciences
Wollaston Medal winners
Tectonicists